Light in Babylon is an international band that formed in 2010, consisting of singer Michal Elia Kamal (Hebrew: מיכל אליה קמל), guitarist Julien Demarque, and santurist Metehan Çiftçi. Since 2017, the band has been joined by bassist Priam Arnoux, and drummer Stuart Dickson.

History 
While traveling in the Balkans, singer Michal Elia Kamal, an Israeli of Iranian heritage, met French guitarist Julien Demarque. Searching together for a santur player to join them, Michal and Julien encountered Turkish santurist Metehan Çiftçi as he was busking in Istanbul. The trio formed initially out of a casual jamming arrangement, in which each spoke different languages but found common ground in music.

The biblical story of the Tower of Babel inspired the band’s moniker, alluding to how the medium of music enabled the three members to play together despite initial difficulties in communicating.

Light in Babylon played extensively on the Beyoğlu District’s Independence Avenue (İstiklal Caddesi), a thoroughfare known for music performances of diverse genres and instrumentation through which it is estimated that three million pedestrians pass each day.

Musical styles and influences 
The band’s style has been described as going beyond strict delineations of language and culture, and as welcoming of all audiences. Accordingly, their music is listed to across numerous intersections of identity, nationality, and religion internationally. Genres that have influenced the band’s style include Turkish music, Balkan songs, Mizrahi music, gypsy traditions, classical and pop music.

Songs are sung in various languages, combining Hebrew, Turkish, Persian, and English.

Discography

Albums

Music Videos

Features

References

External links
 Official website

World music groups